For Her Father's Sake is a 1921 British silent drama film directed by Alexander Butler and starring Owen Nares, Isobel Elsom and James Lindsay. It was based on the play The Perfect Lover by Alfred Sutro.

Cast
 Owen Nares as Walter Cardew 
 Isobel Elsom as Lilian Armitage 
 James Lindsay as William Tremblette 
 Renee Davies as Mary Tremblette 
 Tom Reynolds   
 Norman Partridge as Joseph Tremblette 
 Cicely Reid as Martha Tremblette 
 Wyndham Guise as Mr. Armitage

References

Bibliography
 Low, Rachael. History of the British Film, 1918-1929. George Allen & Unwin, 1971.

External links

1921 films
1921 drama films
British drama films
British silent feature films
Films directed by Alexander Butler
British black-and-white films
1920s English-language films
1920s British films
Silent drama films